Lieutenant Norman Roberts (1896–1980) was a British World War I flying ace credited with five aerial victories.

Military service
Roberts was commissioned as a temporary second lieutenant (on probation) in the Royal Flying Corps on 5 July 1917. He eventually flew a Bristol F.2 Fighter in No. 48 Squadron, where he scored five victories against first-line German fighters between 12 March and 27 June 1918. His final tally was two Fokker D.VIIs and a Fokker Dr.I triplane destroyed, and two triplanes driven down out of control.

Honours and awards
Distinguished Flying Cross
Lieutenant Norman Roberts
"This officer has destroyed three enemy machines and driven down two others out of control. He has also distinguished himself in attacking troops at low altitudes, and has carried out valuable reconnaissance service. Detailed to make a reconnaissance of an important area, he realised, on crossing our lines, that the wind was almost at hurricane strength, and that in face of such a wind his return journey would only be accomplished with extreme difficulty. However, knowing the urgency of his mission, he completed his reconnaissance, penetrating 12 miles behind the enemy lines. On the return journey, owing to the strength of the gale, he was forced to descend to a very low altitude, and was subjected to heavy anti-aircraft and machine-gun fire, which badly damaged his machine."

References
Notes

Bibliography
 

1896 births
1980 deaths
People from Broughton, Lancashire
Royal Flying Corps officers
Royal Air Force personnel of World War I
British World War I flying aces
Recipients of the Distinguished Flying Cross (United Kingdom)
Military personnel from Preston, Lancashire
Royal Air Force officers